Ingram is a city in Kerr County, Texas, United States. The population was 1,804 at the 2010 census.

Geography

Ingram is located in eastern Kerr County at  (30.076903, –99.237367), on the Guadalupe River in the Texas Hill Country. Texas State Highway 27 passes through the center of town, leading east to Kerrville and northwest  to Mountain Home. Texas State Highway 39 runs west from Ingram  to Hunt. Interstate 10 comes within  of Ingram, with the closest access from Exit 501 (FM 1338).

One of the main attractions of Ingram is the swimming activities along the Guadalupe River which runs through the town. A staple of this is Ingram Dam, a structure where the water flows easily over the dam, creating a layer of algae in the stream down the concrete. People frequently congregate and swim around the dam, as well as sliding down the slick algae for recreation.

An artistic replica of Stonehenge is located on the grounds of the Hill Country Arts Foundation.

Climate

The climate in this area is characterized by hot, humid summers and generally mild to cool winters.  According to the Köppen Climate Classification system, Ingram has a humid subtropical climate, abbreviated "Cfa" on climate maps.

Demographics

2020 census

As of the 2020 United States census, there were 1,787 people, 750 households, and 510 families residing in the city.

2010 census
As of the census of 2000, there were 1,740 people, 639 households, and 470 families residing in the city. The population density was 1,364.1 people per square mile (524.9/km). There were 711 housing units at an average density of 557.4 per square mile (214.5/km). The racial makeup of the city was 94.94% White, 0.11% African American, 0.57% Native American, 0.57% Asian, 0.06% Pacific Islander, 2.76% from other races, and 0.98% from two or more races. Hispanic or Latino of any race were 13.97% of the population.

There were 639 households, out of which 37.4% had children under the age of 18 living with them, 55.2% were married couples living together, 13.0% had a female householder with no husband present, and 26.4% were non-families. 22.7% of all households were made up of individuals, and 11.6% had someone living alone who was 65 years of age or older. The average household size was 2.72 and the average family size was 3.19.

In the city, the population was spread out, with 29.4% under the age of 18, 8.4% from 18 to 24, 30.2% from 25 to 44, 20.6% from 45 to 64, and 11.4% who were 65 years of age or older. The median age was 35 years. For every 100 females, there were 99.3 males. For every 100 females age 18 and over, there were 94.3 males.

The median income for a household in the city was $30,958, and the median income for a family was $33,542. Males had a median income of $24,779 versus $17,738 for females. The per capita income for the city was $12,883. About 11.0% of families and 13.3% of the population were below the poverty line, including 15.3% of those under age 18 and 12.5% of those age 65 or over.

Due to the popular summer camps in the area, the population grows significantly June through August.  One of the more well known camps in Ingram is privately owned Vista Camps which has two camps, Camp Rio Vista for Boys and Camp Sierra Vista for Girls.   Camp Rio Vista is the oldest boys camp in Texas having been established in 1921.

Education

The city is served by the Ingram Independent School District.

References

External links
 Official website
 West Kerr County Chamber of Commerce
 West Kerr Current, newspaper
 

Cities in Texas
Cities in Kerr County, Texas
Populated places on the Guadalupe River (Texas)